Baasha ( Baʿshāʾ) may refer to:

 Baasha of Israel, third king of the northern Israelite Kingdom of Israel
 Elah son of Baasha
 Baasha of Ammon, king of Ammon in the 850s B.C.

Baasha may also refer to:
 Madras baashai
 Baashha, 1995 Indian Tamil film also known as Baasha

Hebrew-language given names